

Route list
The following is a list of territorial highways in the Northwest Territories of Canada.

Unnumbered highways

Access by community

The communities reached by the all-weather highway network are:

 Behchoko (Rae-Edzo)
 Dettah
 Enterprise
 Fort Liard
 Fort McPherson
 Fort Providence
 Fort Resolution
 Fort Simpson
 Fort Smith
 Hay River
 Inuvik
 Jean Marie River
 Kakisa
 site of Pine Point
 Tsiigehtchic
 Tuktoyaktuk
 Wrigley
 Whatì
 Yellowknife

Communities that can only be reached by ice-road are:

 Aklavik
 Colville Lake
 Deline
 Gamèti
 Hay River Reserve
 Fort Good Hope
 Nahanni Butte
 Norman Wells
 Trout Lake
 Tulita
 Wekweeti

Communities with no access by surface vehicle:

 Lutselk'e
 Paulatuk
 Sachs Harbour
 Ulukhaktok

See also

References

External links

 NWT Highways Reports

Northwest Territories

Highways